The AVN Award for Female Foreign Performer of the Year is an award that has been given by sex industry company AVN since the award's inception in 2003. French-born actresses Katsuni and Anissa Kate and Czech-born actress Little Caprice have each won the award three times, while Hungarian-born Aleska Diamond and Polish-born Misha Cross have each won the award twice.

As of January 2023, the titleholder is Little Caprice.

Winners and nominees

2000s

2010s

2020s

See also
 AVN Award for Male Foreign Performer of the Year

References

Awards established in 2003
Female Foreign Performer of the Year